Muhammad Wafi bin Aminuddin (born 20 September 2000) is a Bruneian footballer currently playing as a defender for DPMM FC and the Brunei national team.

Club career
Born to a footballing family, Wafi began training with youth scheme Projek Ikan Pusu ever since he was 5 years old. He attended Maktab Sains as a schoolboy. He was already a youth international by the age of 14, and was even invited to a football camp in Munich, Germany courtesy of Allianz two years later.

Wafi began his league career with the Tabuan Muda national youth setup, captaining the under-17 club side in the 2016 Brunei Premier League followed by the 'A' team that played in the 2017-18 Brunei Super League. After a training stint at the Tokyo Institute of Technology in Japan in late 2018, Wafi joined DPMM FC initially as a youth player to compete in the 2019 Brunei Premier League. After the academy side comfortably claimed the league title, Wafi's performances as captain impressed new head coach Adrian Pennock enough to place him in the first team.

Wafi made his Singapore Premier League debut in the 1-7 victory against Balestier Khalsa on 13 April 2019.

Playing domestically in the Brunei leagues since 2020, Wafi played at the 2022 Brunei FA Cup and won the competition on December 4 of that year.

Career statistics

Club

Notes

Honours
DPMM FC
Brunei Premier League: 2018-19
Singapore Premier League: 2019
Brunei FA Cup: 2022

International goals

Personal life
Wafi's brothers are all footballers. Afi is an established Brunei international with 15 caps and plays for Kasuka FC. Ulfi appeared for Brunei youth teams and currently plays futsal with Kasuka & Ar Rawda. The youngest brother Bazli is a Brunei under-19 international.

References

External links

Living people
2000 births
Bruneian footballers
Brunei international footballers
Association football defenders
Singapore Premier League players
DPMM FC players
Competitors at the 2019 Southeast Asian Games
Southeast Asian Games competitors for Brunei